SCID may stand for:

Computing 
 Shane's Chess Information Database, a chess database to maintain, view and replay chess games
 Source Code in Database, program source code stored in a database with structural relations reflecting the language syntax and program structure
 Synchronous optical networking, carrier identification

Health 
 Severe combined immunodeficiency, a genetic disorder in which the immune system fails to develop
 Severe combined immunodeficiency (non-human), a variation in nonhumans
 Structured Clinical Interview for DSM-IV
 SCI/D, referring to spinal cord injury and spinal cord disorder